James Charles McDonald (June 14, 1840 – December 1, 1912) was a Roman Catholic bishop who served as fourth Bishop of the Roman Catholic Diocese of Charlottetown.

Biography
Born in St. Andrews, Prince Edward Island, McDonald received his education from the Central Academy in Charlottetown and taught in a number of Island schools for many years. Following the completion of his studies at Charlottetown's St. Dunsant's College, McDonald travelled to the Grand Seminary of Montreal and was ordained in 1873. 

McDonald taught briefly at St. Dunstan's College and was a pastor in Kings County for nine years. Later, McDonald would be named Rector of St. Dunstan's, a position he held for seven years. 

In 1891, following the death of Bishop Peter McIntyre, McDonald was immediately appointed Bishop, after serving as Coadjutor bishop since 1890. 

Bishop McDonald's tenure was seen as a period of growth for the Diocese of Charlottetown. Many new churches were built throughout Prince Edward Island, St. Dunstan's College became affiliated with Université Laval in Quebec City in 1892, and the Notre-Dame Convent for Girls flourished. 

In 1896, construction began on the new St. Dunstan's Basilica (the one before the present basilica that stands today). The new basilica was built out of stone and considered one of the most magnificent churches east of Quebec. 

In 1908, after many years of service, McDonald's health began to fail, and he was left an invalid. At this time, Father James Morrison, Vicar General of the Diocese, stepped in to take care of diocesan administration. 

Bishop McDonald finally succumbed to his ill health and died at his Charlottetown residence in 1912. His funeral took place at St. Dunstan's Basilica and his remains were interred in his native home of St. Andrew's.

References

External links
 Biography at the Dictionary of Canadian Biography Online
 The Era of Bishop Charles McDonald

1840 births
1912 deaths
People from Kings County, Prince Edward Island
Roman Catholic bishops of Charlottetown
19th-century Roman Catholic bishops in Canada
20th-century Roman Catholic bishops in Canada